Rustenburg Local Municipality is a local municipality in Bojanala Platinum District Municipality, North West Province, South Africa. 

Rustenburg City is situated at the foot of the Magalies mountain range in the North West province of South Africa. Rustenburg (meaning “town of rest” or “resting place”) was proclaimed a township in 1851. The city of Rustenburg is situated some 112 km northwest, ninety minute drive from both Johannesburg and Pretoria. It is a malaria-free area.

Rustenburg is the fastest growing municipality in South Africa, with the population rising from 387,096 in 2001 to 449,776 in 2007. It is the most populous municipality in the North West province.

Rustenburg is a Dutch name meaning "town (originally castle) of rest".

Main places
The 2001 census divided the municipality into the following main places:

Politics 

The municipal council consists of eighty-nine members elected by mixed-member proportional representation. Forty-five councillors are elected by first-past-the-post voting in forty-five wards, while the remaining forty-four are chosen from party lists so that the total number of party representatives is proportional to the number of votes received. In the election of 1 November 2021 no party won a majority on the council.

The following table shows the results of the election.

References

External links
 Official website

Local municipalities of the Bojanala Platinum District Municipality